Shin Jong-hun (born May 5, 1989, Seoul) is a South Korean light flyweight amateur boxer.

Career
Shin won the light flyweight bronze medal at the 2009 World Amateur Boxing Championships, which was his first international competition, defeating Cuban champion Daniel Matellon Ramos in the quarterfinals.

At the 2010 Asian Games he lost early 3:17 to Birzhan Zhakypov.

At 2011 World Amateur Boxing Championships he came back strong, however, to win silver, losing the final to superstar Zou Shiming. He hereby qualified for the Olympics.  At the 2012 Summer Olympics, he lost his opening match to Aleksandar Aleksandrov.

Shin is currently boxing for the Seoul Metropolitan Government Boxing Club.

Results

2009 World Championships

References

External links
WorldChamps2009
The-Sports.org

Living people
1989 births
People from Seoul
Sportspeople from Seoul
Boxers at the 2012 Summer Olympics
Olympic boxers of South Korea
Asian Games medalists in boxing
Boxers at the 2010 Asian Games
Boxers at the 2014 Asian Games
South Korean male boxers
AIBA World Boxing Championships medalists
Asian Games gold medalists for South Korea
Boxers at the 2018 Asian Games
Medalists at the 2014 Asian Games
Light-flyweight boxers